Richard Crosse may refer to:
 Richard Crosse (painter)
 Richard Crosse (British Army officer)
 Richard Crosse (priest)

See also
 Richard Cross (disambiguation)